Foolish Things is a rock/alternative rock/Christian rock band previously signed with Inpop Records.

History
The band took their name from 1 Corinthians 1:27–29 "God chose the foolish things of the world to shame the wise".

The band won the coveted Music in the Rockies competition for unknown Christian artists in 2000.

They had been putting out demo CDs and EPs for many years when they released a much anticipated full-length album titled Let's Not Forget the Story on July 18, 2006.

Farewell Tour – May 2008
After 10 years of working together, during their tour, they announced that they would be disbanding.

Upon releasing their second full-length album in early 2008, the band played their last show in Denver on May 15, 2008 at the Gothic Theatre.

American Idol
Mark Labriola, the group's lead singer, made an appearance on Fox's American Idol in 2010.  He was dismissed in the coveted "Hollywood Week."

Members
Mark Labriola II – Vocals, Background Vocals, Programming
Isaac Jorgensen – Vocals, Background Vocals, Programming, Piano, Acoustic Guitar, Electric Guitar
Nate Phillips – Bass guitar
Shaul Hagen – Drums
James Rightmer – Background Vocals, Programming, Piano, Keyboard, Electric Guitar

Discography

Albums
Foolish Things (2002)
Let's Not Forget the Story (2006) Reviews: cmspin Jesus Freak Hideout
Even Now (2007)

Singles
Spirit Come (2006)
Who Can Compare (2007)

References

External links
Foolish Things Official Myspace site
Foolish Things purevolume Site

Alternative rock groups from Colorado
American Christian rock groups
Musical groups established in 1997
Inpop Records artists